Muñecas is a province in the Bolivian department of La Paz. Its capital is Chuma.

Subdivision 
The province is divided into three municipalities which are further subdivided into cantons.

Places of interest 
 Iskanwaya

External links 
 Map of the Muñecas Province

Provinces of La Paz Department (Bolivia)